Rafael Santos (born 13 June 1944) is a Salvadoran sprinter. He competed in the men's 100 metres at the 1968 Summer Olympics.

References

1944 births
Living people
Athletes (track and field) at the 1968 Summer Olympics
Salvadoran male sprinters
Olympic athletes of El Salvador
Place of birth missing (living people)
Central American Games bronze medalists for El Salvador
Central American Games medalists in athletics